Atheneite is a rare palladium, mercury arsenide mineral with the chemical formula  associated with palladium–gold deposits. Its composition parallels that of arsenopalladinite, isomertieite and meritieite-II (Cabral, 2002).

Discovery and occurrence
It was discovered in 1974 by A.M. Clark, A.J. Criddle, and E.E. Fejer in the Minas Gerais mine in the town of Itabira, Brazil (Clark, 1974). Atheneite was also found in 1982 during a major gold rush at Serra Pelada in northern Brazil.  Since then it has been found in the northern region of Para, Brazil, the northern region of Russia, and the Limpopo province of South Africa (Cabral, 2002; Trabaev, 1995).  Its name is derived from the Greek goddess Pallas Athena for its association with palladium-gold deposits. It was first found in concentrates from gold washings in Brazil with intergrowths of arsenopalladinite (Fleischer, 1974).  Hematite was also found in intergrowths with atheneite, and is interpreted as being the product of a low temperature, hydrothermal origin.

Structure

Atheneite crystallizes in the hexagonal crystal system with space group P2m and a point grouping of m2.  It has a ditrigonal dipyramidal crystal form.  This mineral does not extinguish under crossed polars, showing bright anisotropic colors from purple-brown to dark grey (Fleischer, 1974).  These birefringence colors are of the first order.  The atomic structure of atheneite is very similar to that of the hexagonal structure carbons that make up graphite.

Physical properties

Atheneite has a metallic luster and its color ranges from white/gray to blue/gray tint.  Its Mohs hardness scale is 4.5-5.  The Vickers hardness test puts this mineral at a 48.  Atheneite also has a specific gravity of 10.2.  When placed in a reflected light, it gives off a white light with a yellowish hue and shows very weak reflectance pleochroism in oil (Fleischer, 1974).

References

 New mineral names, Fleischer, Michael In:  American Mineralogist, 1974, vol. 59, Issue 11-12, pp 1330–1332.
 Palladium and Platinum Minerals From the Serra Pelada Au-Pd-Pt Deposit, Carajas Mineral Province, Northern Brazil,  Cabral, Alexandre Raphael; Lehmann, Bernd; Dwitdo-Ribeiro, Ribeiro; Cravo Costa; Henrique, Carlos:  The Canadian Mineralogist, 2002, vol. 40, pp1451–1463.
 Palladium Gold and Palladium Arsenide-Antimonide Minerals from Congo Soco Iron Ored Mine, Quadrilatero Ferritero, Minas Gerais Brazil, Cabral, A.R.:  Kwitko, R:  Jones R.D.  Applied earth science, vol.111, num. 1, April 2002, pp. 74–80.
 Palladium arsenide-antimonides from Itabira, Minas Gerais, Brazil, Clark, A. M. In: Mineralogical Magazine and Journal of the Mineralogical Society, 1974, Vol. 39, Issue 305, pp. 528–543
 New Gold-Palladium Type of Mineralization in the Kozhim Region of Circumpolar Ural (Russia).  Trabaev, M.B.;  Kuznetsov, S.K.;  Moralev, G.V.;  Soboleva, A.A.;  Laputina, I.P.  Geology of Ore Deposits, 1995.

Arsenide minerals
Mercury minerals
Palladium minerals
Hexagonal minerals
Minerals in space group 189